Joan Woodward (27 September 1916 – 1971) was a British professor in industrial sociology and organizational studies.

Background
Woodward was educated at Oxford University, where she gained a first in Philosophy, Politics and Economics in 1936, followed by an MA in medieval philosophy from Durham University in 1938, and a Diploma in Social and Public Administration from Oxford in 1939. During World War II she worked as a manager, rising to be Senior Labour Manager at ROF Bridgwater. She undertook her early research at South East Essex College of Technology, before joining Imperial College in 1957 as a part-time lecturer in Industrial Sociology and was appointed to a Senior Lectureship in the Production Engineering Section in 1962.

Pursuits
Woodward was a leading academic and commentator in the field of Organization Theory, particularly Contingency Theory. Woodward was a pioneer for empirical research in organizational structures and author of analytical frameworks that establish the link between technology and production systems and their role in shaping effective organizational structures. She classified the technology into Unit based or (Small scale), Mass based or (large scale) and Continuous process organizations. All successful organizations in these categories, according to her, had a particular organizational structure. 

In 1964, she was invited to work part-time for the Ministry of Labour. This was followed, in 1969, by an appointment as Professor of Industrial Sociology and Director of the Industrial Sociology Unit.

In 1970, Prof. Woodward published a book Industrial Organization: Behaviour and Control. This text described the complete work of her research group since 1962.

Her work received international recognition, leading to an invitation to join a group of the top seven organization theorists that was called the Magnificent Seven. Such international acclaim was rare for a woman at this period.

Woodward died in 1971, aged 54, after treatment for breast cancer.

Works
 The Dockworker: an analysis of conditions of employment in the port of Manchester.. Liverpool: University of Liverpool Press, 1954
 The Saleswoman: a study of attitudes and behaviour in retail distribution. London: Isaac Pitman & Sons, 1960
 Industrial Organization: Theory and Practice. London, New York: Oxford University Press, 1965.
 (with Allan Flanders and Ruth Pomeranz) Experiment in industrial democracy: a study of the John Lewis Partnership. London: Faber, 1968.
 (ed.) Industrial Organization: Behaviour and Control. London: Oxford University Press, 1970.

Legacy
As the second woman to receive a chair at Imperial College, Woodward is a role model for women in science, engineering and technology. The bi-annual Joan Woodward Memorial Lecture takes place at Imperial College Business School. The Joan Woodward Prize is bestowed annually on an undergraduate or post-graduate undertaking a thesis in a topic that matches the research interests of Joan Woodward. Both the lecture series and student prizes are supported by an endowment fund that has been established in her name.

In 2010 Woodward was the subject of a collection of essays in her honour.

References

1916 births
1971 deaths
British business theorists
British sociologists
Alumni of the University of Oxford
Deaths from breast cancer
Alumni of St Mary's College, Durham